The National Assembly of Mali is the unicameral country's legislative body of 147 voting members.

Members of the National Assembly, called deputies, are elected by direct universal suffrage for a five-year term, during which they enjoy parliamentary immunity. Members are directly elected in single-member districts using a two-round voting system where candidates must receive an absolute majority of votes in order to win.

The Assembly normally meets twice a year, on the first Monday in October for no more than 75 days and the first Monday in April for no more than 90 days. The Prime Minister or a majority of the members can call an extra session. If the session is held at the instigation of Assembly members, it must not exceed 15 days.

The 2013 elections were the first held after the 2012 Malian coup d'état which led to the overthrow of President Amadou Toumani Touré. The current National Assembly was formed following two rounds of parliamentary elections, held on 24 November and 15 December. The Rally for Mali (RPM) party and its allies were victorious, capturing 115 of the 147 seats. RPM Deputy Issaka Sidibé was elected President of the National Assembly on 22 January 2014.  Nearly 85% of members are newcomers serving their first term.

13 of the 147 (8.8%) elected members are women, one less than the previous Assembly. On 12 November 2015, the National Assembly adopted a law requiring that at least 30% of elected or appointed officials must be women.

Controversies
A 2009 amendment to the Malian Family Code which would have given women more rights was met by huge demonstrations by Muslims demanding it not be signed, following which President Toure sent the bill back to the parliament.

See also
History of Mali
Politics of Mali
List of legislatures by country
List of presidents of the National Assembly of Mali
Legislative branch

References

External links

Official site of the National Assembly of Mali 
Assemblée Nationale at the official site of the President of Mali, including listings of the parliamentary groups and commissions 

Bamako
Mali, National Assembly
Mali
Politics of Mali
Political organisations based in Mali
Mali